Galyat region, or hill tract, (also written Galliat and Galiyat) is a narrow strip or area roughly 50–80 km north-east of Islamabad, Pakistan, extending on both sides of the Khyber Pakhtunkhwa-Punjab border, between Abbottabad and Murree. The word itself is derived from the plural of the Urdu word gali, which means an alley between two mountains on both sides of which there are valleys and it is not the highest point in the range. Many of the towns in the area have the word gali as part of their names, and are popular tourist resorts.
Being on linguistic and geographical continuum this area has challenged social scientists in terms of anomalous classification.

Brief history and ethnology

The Galyat tracts were first 'discovered' by early British colonial officials, such as James Abbott (Indian Army officer), who ventured into these areas circa 1846–47. The British found them climatically conducive to them and began to develop some of the sites in the range/tract as hill resorts, to escape the summer heat of the low-lands. Later on, after Partition/Independence of Pakistan in 1947, these were neglected for some time but eventually developed further from the 1960s onwards as popular resorts.

The area, being home to the Karlal tribe, was called the 'Karral country' during the colonial times by the British (named after the tribe). The Karlal's are still the dominant tribe of the Galyat. The language spoke by the tribesmen is Hindko whereas the dialect of Hindko spoken is called the 'Dhundi-Kairali'.
It is today located in what is the Abbottabad District, Khyber Pakhtunkhwa. At an elevation of 2,410 m (8,000 ft), it is a popular tourist resort in the summer months. It is forested with pine, cedar, oak walnut and also oak and maple trees.

Localities in the Galyat
 Ayubia (Khyber-Pakhtunkhwa)
Bara Gali (Khyber-Pakhtunkhwa)
Changla Gali (Khyber-Pakhtunkhwa)
Dunga Gali (Khyber-Pakhtunkhwa)
Khaira Gali (Khyber-Pakhtunkhwa)
Khanspur (Khyber-Pakhtunkhwa)
Nathia Gali (Khyber-Pakhtunkhwa)
Thandiani (Khyber-Pukhtunkhwa)
Darwaza Ayubia (Khyber Pukhtunkhwa)
Dagri Naka (Khyber-Pakhtunkhwa)
Bagnotar (Khyber-Pakhtunkhwa)
Namli Maira (Khyber-Pakhtunkhwa)
Makol (Khyber-Pakhtunkhwa)
Murree (Punjab)
Jhika Gali (Punjab)
Ghora Gali (Punjab)
Bandi maira kpk)

References

Hill stations in Pakistan
Galyat of Pakistan
Geography of Khyber Pakhtunkhwa
Tourism in Khyber Pakhtunkhwa
Internal borders of Pakistan